Bad Urach is a town in the district of Reutlingen, Baden-Württemberg, Germany. It is situated 14 km east of Reutlingen, at the foot of the Swabian Alb (or Swabian Alps in English), and is known for its spa and therapeutic bath.

Neighbouring communities
The following towns border Urach, and are also part of the district of Reutlingen. Clockwise from the north are: Hülben, Grabenstetten, Römerstein, Gutsbezirk Münsingen, Münsingen, St. Johann and Dettingen an der Erms.

Bad Urach consists of the districts Hengen (687.01 ha; 854 inhabitants, at 31 December 2005), Seeburg (220.65 ha; 302 inhabitants), Sirchingen (481.78 ha; 1031 inhabitants), Bad Urach (2,797, 89 ha; 9289 inhabitants) and Wittlingen (1362.24 ha; 1112 inhabitants). With the exception of the district Bad Urach the neighborhoods form simultaneously villages within the meaning of Baden-Wuerttemberg Municipal Code.

Urach includes the homestead of Güterstein. Among the districts Hengen and Sirchingen each include only the villages of the same name. Seeburg includes the village Seeburg, castle and courtyard and the village of Wittlingen, the homestead Hohenwittlingen and the individual houses, Georgenau, the pumping station Ermsgruppe XIII, including Front Albgruppe, Schanz and Villa Mühleisen. In the Hengen district is the castle Gardena. In the district of Bad Urach are the  villages Berg, Gyrenbad, Merzhausen, Hausen, Sontheim and Weiler, and in Wittlingen district are the villages Henni fountain, Hofstetten and Winneden and castle Baldeck.

History
In the early Stone Age, the Alb was already populated, and several caves in the area show evidence that they provided shelter for the inhabitants.

During the Alemanni period Bad Urach had an important castle. Owing to its prime location on a hill overlooking the Erms Valley, Hohenurach Castle was built around 1025. In the Middle Ages Bad Urach (at that time only known as Urach) became a centre of power. The castle became a state prison in the late Middle Ages; the poet Philipp Nikodemus Frischlin died while trying to escape over its walls in 1590. In the 18th century, the fortress was razed to the ground by the citizenry.

Around 1260 Urach became part of Württemberg. Nearly 100 years later, at the time when Württemberg was divided, the southern part of the region was governed from Urach, the so-called "secret capital", which was the residential home of the Dukes of Württemberg from 1442 until 1482. Count Eberhard the Bearded was born here in 1445 and returned there frequently throughout his life. Over the next several centuries, the town prospered and became a centre for weaving. It escaped serious damage during any wars and so remains in excellent historical condition.
In 1561 to 1565 a institute produced 30000 bibles in Urach and smuggled.

Since 1985 the town has been a nationally recognized spa town.

Geology

The Urach volcanic area
Several million years ago the area was actively volcanic.

Due to an anomaly in the subsurface, the town has a thermal spring with water at 61 °C. The spring was developed to serve a spa operation and mineral thermal baths.

In the early part of the 21st century a geothermal project was started, to develop electricity generation and heating in the town. The project failed in 2004 due to insufficient finance.

Sights
Bad Urach possesses a late-medieval marketplace with a city hall and half-timbered houses that date from the 15th and 16th centuries.

The Residenzschloss (Castle Residence), the residential home of the Counts of Württemberg-Urach where Eberhard the Bearded was born, contains rooms that date from the Gothic, Renaissance, and Baroque periods. The Goldener Saal (Golden Hall), one of Germany's loveliest Renaissance rooms, is particularly worth a visit.

The Church of Saint Amandus dates from 1477 and was built in the Gothic style for Eberhard the Bearded. His lavish praying desk dates from 1472. The pulpit is decorated with figures of the saints and church fathers and is considered an important piece of German stonemasonry. The 1518 baptismal font is by the sculptor .

Also of interest are the ruins of the old castle (Schloss Hohenurach) and the waterfall (Uracher Wasserfall) on the hiking trail up to it. The "round mountain" ("Runder Berg"), a former volcano, is of archeological interest and shows an old Alemanni castle.

Economy and infrastructure

Transport
The Bundesstraße 28 runs through the city and connects it to the west with Reutlingen and Tübingen and to the east with Ulm. The B 465 leads from Bad Urach to Ehingen and Biberach.

The Erms Valley Railway connects Bad Urach with Metzingen, there is connection to the Plochingen-Tübingen railway.

The Public transport is guaranteed by the Verkehrsverbund Neckar-Alb-Donau (NALDO). The city is located in the comb 221.

Court, authorities and bodies
Bad Urach has a District Court, which belongs to the Landgerichtsbezirk Tübingen and Oberlandesgerichtsbezirk Stuttgart. Furthermore, Bad Urach has a tax office (Finanzamt) and with the Ermstal Clinic a hospital.

The city is also home to the Kirchenbezirk Bad Urach of the Evangelical-Lutheran Church in Württemberg.

Education
In the city there are the Graf-Eberhard-Gymnasium, the Geschwister-Scholl-Realschule. Since 2012 there is, named after Barbara Gonzaga, the Barbara Gonzaga Community school Bad Urach , the primary school in Wittlingen district,  two special schools as well as a business school.

Tourism
Bad Urach has a far into the 19th century reaching tradition in tourism  and performs the predicate health resort and spa. The successful drilling for mineral thermal water and its development led in 1983 to the recognition as a spa, which had according to the Statistical Office of Baden-Württemberg for Bad Urach in 2012 the number of 367.344 overnight stays.

Famous people

 Gottfried von Neifen (beginning of the 13th century to – c. 1255), Minnesinger
 Eberhard the Bearded (1445–1496), first Duke of Württemberg
 Christoph (1515–1568), fourth Duke of Württemberg
  Hans Ungnad von Weißenwolff, Freiherr von Sonneck, Hans III. (1493–1564) Bible printer and smuggler
  (1629–1665), legal advocate during the witch trials
 Max Friz (1883–1966), one of three men responsible for the founding of BMW
 Georg Joos (1894–1959), German physicist

 Reinhard Breymayer (born 1944), philologist
 Cem Özdemir (born 1965), German politician with Alliance '90/The Greens
 (born 1972), German actress and spokeswoman born in the town

Gallery

References

External link

Towns in Baden-Württemberg
Reutlingen (district)
Counties of the Holy Roman Empire
Württemberg
Spa towns in Germany